"Udûn" is the sixth episode of the first season of the American fantasy television series The Lord of the Rings: The Rings of Power, based on the novel The Lord of the Rings and its appendices by J. R. R. Tolkien. Set in the Second Age of Middle-earth, thousands of years before Tolkien's The Hobbit and The Lord of the Rings, it depicts a large battle in the Southlands. The episode was written by Nicholas Adams, Justin Doble, and showrunners J. D. Payne and Patrick McKay, and directed by Charlotte Brändström.

Amazon made a multi-season commitment for a new The Lord of the Rings series in November 2017. Payne and McKay were set to develop it in July 2018. Filming for the first season took place in New Zealand, and work on episodes beyond the first two began in January 2021. Brändström was revealed to be directing two episodes of the season that May, including the sixth episode. Production wrapped for the season in August 2021.

"Udûn" premiered on the streaming service Amazon Prime Video on September 30, 2022. It was estimated to have high viewership and received generally positive reviews.

Plot 
An army of Orcs led by Adar find the tower of Ostirith abandoned. While they search for refugees from the Southlands town of Tirharad, the Elf Arondir triggers a booby-trap that collapses the tower on the army. The townspeople, who had moved down the valley to the village, cheer as the tower falls. Meanwhile, Galadriel, Queen Regent Míriel, and soldiers from Númenór make their way towards the Southlands by ship. Galadriel meets Isildur, and learns from his father Elendil that Isildur's mother drowned.

Arondir attempts to destroy the broken sword that the Orcs are searching for but is unable to with conventional tools. He tells the human healer Brownyn that he is going to hide it as her son Theo watches on from a distance. Arondir helps the town prepare for the next assault. He professes his love to Bronwyn and promises a life together with her and Theo after the battle is over. That night, the Orc army enters Tirharad. The townspeople trap the Orcs in the center of the village and are victorious, but soon realize that many of the enemies they just killed were their neighbors, who joined Adar and had been disguised as Orcs. The townspeople are horrified with their actions.

Orc archers shoot at the townsfolk, killing and wounding many. Bronwyn is hit in the shoulder. Taking refuge in the tavern, Theo and Arondir cauterize Bronwyn's wound. Adar enters and demands the location of the broken sword. Arondir attempts to negotiate, but the Orcs continue to kill people. When Bronwyn is threatened, Theo reveals the sword and gives it to Adar. Adar orders the rest of the humans to be killed, but as the Númenórean army arrives on horseback and kills or captures the remaining Orcs. Adar gives Waldreg a task before attempting to escape, only to be captured by Galadriel and Halbrand.

Galadriel interrogates Adar, discovering that he is an Elf who was corrupted by the first Dark Lord, Morgoth, and was turned into one of the first Orcs. He claims to have killed the second Dark Lord, Sauron, and is now focused on creating a home for all Orcs. Halbrand is hailed as the King of the Southlands and the Númenóreans celebrate their victory. Theo realizes that the broken sword is missing as Waldreg uses it to unlock the dam beside Ostirith. Water rushes into tunnels that the Orcs dug to the mountain Orodruin. The water enters a lava chamber beneath the mountain and the resulting pressure causes an eruption that spews lava, ash, and smoke over the Southlands.

Production

Development 
Amazon acquired the global television rights for J. R. R. Tolkien's The Lord of the Rings in November 2017. The company's streaming service, Amazon Prime Video, gave a multi-season commitment to a series based on the novel and its appendices, to be produced by Amazon Studios. It was later titled The Lord of the Rings: The Rings of Power. Amazon hired J. D. Payne and Patrick McKay to develop the series and serve as showrunners in July 2018. Justin Doble had joined the series as a writer by July 2019, and Charlotte Brändström was revealed to be directing two episodes of the first season in May 2021. The series is set in the Second Age of Middle-earth, thousands of years before the events of Tolkien's The Hobbit and The Lord of the Rings, and the first season focuses on introducing the setting and major heroic characters to the audience. Written by Nicholas Adams, Doble, Payne, and McKay, and directed by Brändström, the sixth episode is titled "Udûn".

Casting 

The series' large cast includes Cynthia Addai-Robinson as Míriel, Maxim Baldry as Isildur, Nazanin Boniadi as Bronwyn, Morfydd Clark as Galadriel, Ismael Cruz Córdova as Arondir, Tyroe Muhafidin as Theo, Lloyd Owen as Elendil, and Charlie Vickers as Halbrand. Also starring are Peter Tait as Tredwill, Anthony Crum as Ontamo, Alex Tarrant as Valandil, and Phil Grieve as Bazur.

Filming 
Amazon confirmed in September 2019 that filming for the first season would take place in New Zealand, where the Lord of the Rings and Hobbit film trilogies were made. Filming primarily took place at Kumeu Film Studios and Auckland Film Studios in Auckland, under the working title Untitled Amazon Project or simply UAP. Production on episodes beyond the first two began in January 2021, and Brändström was in New Zealand for production in May. Filming for the season wrapped on August 2.

Visual effects 
Visual effects for the episode were created by Industrial Light & Magic (ILM), Wētā FX, Method Studios, Rodeo FX, DNEG, Rising Sun Pictures, Cause and FX, Atomic Arts, and Cantina Creative.

Music 

A soundtrack album featuring composer Bear McCreary's score for the episode was released on Amazon Music on September 29, 2022. McCreary said the album contained "virtually every second of score" from the episode. It was added to other music streaming services after the full first season was released. All music composed by Bear McCreary:

Release 
"Udûn" premiered on Prime Video in the United States on September 30, 2022. It was released at the same time around the world, in more than 240 countries and territories.

Reception

Viewership 
Software company Whip Media, who track viewership data for the 21 million worldwide users of their TV Time app, calculated that for the week ending October 2, two days after the episode's debut, The Rings of Power was the second-highest original streaming series for U.S. viewership behind Disney+'s She-Hulk: Attorney at Law. This was a move up from being fifth-place the week before. Nielsen Media Research, who record streaming viewership on U.S. television screens, estimated that the series was watched for 966 million minutes during the week ending October 2. This put the series in third-place on the company's list of top streaming series and films, behind only Netflix's Cobra Kai and Disney+'s Hocus Pocus 2. Parrot Analytics determines audience "demand expressions" based on various data sources, including social media activity and comments on rating platforms. During the week ending October 7, the company calculated that The Rings of Power was 30.3 times more in demand than the average U.S. streaming series, moving it up to seventh on the company's top 10 list for the week.

Critical response 

The review aggregator website Rotten Tomatoes reported an 86% approval rating with an average score of 8.3/10 based on 29 reviews. The website's critics consensus reads: "Focusing on a battle for the Southlands, 'Udûn' features some of the most rollicking action ever witnessed on television and delivers The Rings of Power most conventionally satisfying episode yet."

Accolades

Companion media 
An episode of the official aftershow Deadline's Inside the Ring: LOTR: The Rings of Power for "Udûn" was released on October 1, 2022. Hosted by Deadline Hollywood Dominic Patten and Anthony D'Alessandro, it features exclusive "footage and insights" for the episode, plus interviews with cast members Owen, Cordova, Clark, Vickers, Muhafidin, Baldry, and Boniadi as well as Brändström, Doble, and McCreary. On October 14, The Official The Lord of the Rings: The Rings of Power Podcast was released on Amazon Music. Hosted by actress Felicia Day, the sixth episode is dedicated to "Udûn" and features Córdova, Payne, and McKay. On November 21, a bonus segment featuring behind-the-scenes footage from the episode was added to Prime Video's X-Ray feature as part of a series titled "The Making of The Rings of Power".

References

External links 
 

2022 American television episodes
The Lord of the Rings: The Rings of Power